Atash (also Romanized as ‘Aţash; also known as ‘Oţeysh) is a village in Soveyseh Rural District, in the Soveyseh District of Karun County, Khuzestan Province, Iran. At the 2006 census, its population was 417, in 68 families.

References 

Populated places in Karun County